Robby Ray Stewart is a fictional character from the Disney Channel series Hannah Montana, portrayed by Billy Ray Cyrus. Robby is the single father of Jackson Stewart (Jason Earles) and Miley Stewart (Miley Cyrus). He appears in all episodes in seasons 1 and 2, is absent for 3 episodes in season 3, and is absent for 1 episode in season 4. The character is based on Jed Clampett, the main character of The Beverly Hillbillies, even to the point of using Jed's famous catchphrase "Well doggies!".

Casting
Billy Ray Cyrus auditioned for the part along with two other actors. He was only asked to audition after his daughter Miley had been given the lead role. After he was offered the role, Billy Ray at first had reservations about accepting it, saying "The last thing I would want to do is screw up Miley's show." Miley admitted that it was "weird" at first having her real life dad as her television dad, but later described the situation as "really good."

Billy Ray provided much of the inspiration for the character which largely became a fictionalised version of himself.

Biography 
According to the Hannah Montana backstory, Robby was born on July 6, 1968 and grew up in fictional Bufford County, Tennessee. He has a large family with eight brothers and sisters. He has a twin brother named Bobby Ray (also played by Billy Ray Cyrus) and a brother named Earl who is seen in the episode (We're So Sorry) Uncle Earl, and often spoken of. His mother is Ruthie Ray Stewart (Vicki Lawrence), known to his children as "Mamaw." He has a close relationship with Dolly Parton who is his children's godmother.

In his early years, Robby, using the stage name "Robbie Ray," was a successful country music singer-songwriter charting three number one hits and two top fives. He also won a music video of the year award and an International Music Award for artist of the year. He was also honored with a diamond on the Hollywood Parade of Diamonds (a parody of the Hollywood Walk of Fame) prestigiously located in front of Grauman's Chinese Theatre. After his wife Susan (Brooke Shields) died (April 12, 1969 – December 27, 2002), he retired from his career to look after his two children. Soon afterwards, he moved the family from Crowley Corners, Tennessee, to California where Miley became famous as Hannah Montana. He then works as her manager, producer, and primary songwriter. On a few rare occasions, he also performs on stage with Hannah.

As Hannah's manager, Robby wears a fake moustache to hide his identity to keep Miley's secret and sometimes disguises his voice. This ruse, along with his sudden abandonment of his career, may have led one fan (Maddie Fitzpatrick's mother) to believe that he was dead. However, this disguise is often ineffective at preventing his fans from recognizing him, and several times he even publicly identifies himself as Robbie Ray, the father of Hannah Montana. To those who are unfamiliar with his previous career, he is known simply as Mr. Montana. It seems that both aliases effectively conceal his identity as Mr. Stewart.

In Hannah Montana: The Movie, he temporarily moves the family back to Tennessee. There he meets a woman named Lorelai (Melora Hardin) who becomes his love interest. He had previously dated real estate agent Margo Diamond and Lilly Truscott's mother Heather (Heather Locklear) in California.

Personality 
Robby is a very loving father. He is decisive and authoritative with Jackson and Miley when he needs to be, but he often prefers to suggest the right thing to do, rather than force it upon them. For this Jackson and Miley often underestimate his parenting skills. When they try to mislead him, Robby often pretends to fall for it, only to have them find out later that he knew what was going on all along.

A large side of his personality is very childlike. He is not above pulling practical jokes or waging a marshmallow gun war with the Jonas Brothers in the recording studio when other artists are working. When he first came to California, he couldn't resist playing Ding-dong Ditch at the homes of famous stars. He is also very susceptible to having his feelings hurt, especially by Miley.

Being from rural Tennessee, Robby often uses his own "countrified" versions of proverbs and similes, often to the perplexity of Californians Lilly and Oliver. He also is known for his catch phrases "Yee, doggies!," "Dang flabit!," "Say what?!," "Sweet niblets!," and "What the Sam Heck?!"  Two of them ("Say what?!" and "Sweet niblets!") are also used by Miley.

He is proud of his cooking skills, but tends to have an unhealthy diet. He fixes "Loco Hot Coco" (That causes unusual dreams) (his and Miley's "special drink", and when serving it he says "Here's some Loco Hot CoCo with little marshmallows so you don't choke-o." as well as cake or ice cream. He tries to balances his sugar intake with jogging, but he keeps scaling back how much he jogs. Robbie adores eating pie and in many episodes, Robbie tends to use pie to change the subject when he knows something bad has happened. He often says "So.....who wants pie?". Robbie is very protective of his pie and in I Honestly Love You (No Not You), Jackson says that he once almost lost a finger trying to get between his dad and the pie he was eating. Robbie also has "Back when I was a boy" stories which are mentioned in both You Never Give Me My Money and I Honestly Love You (No Not You). These stories irritate both Miley and Jackson. In Torn Between Two Hannahs, Lilly Truscott does a pretty good impression of Robbie, to which Miley describes as "Creepy good".

He is intensely fond of his hair which he prides in keeping in excellent condition. He uses just a dab of volumizing mousse and Brazil nut conditioner which attractes wasps.

His instrument of choice is the guitar which he plays left handed. He seems to have an affinity for Gibson guitars in particular. He owns a sunburst Gibson ES-335, a white Gibson SG, a Gibson J-200 (in a dream sequence), a Gibson Songwriter Deluxe Studio EC, and a "Doves in Flight" custom version of the Gibson Dove which he nicknamed "Lucky Lulu." He also owns a red Fender Telecaster and a Takamine dreadnought. He can also play the violin and steel guitar.

Relationship with Miley 
Robby sometimes offers Miley advice indirectly by using reverse psychology. While Miley has expressed frustration when her father "goes all fortune cookie" on her, she also recognizes her dependence on his advice, especially when she's in a tight spot. She deeply values her relationship with her father and becomes jealous when she feels others threaten the relationship.

A common theme explored in Hannah Montana is Robby's dealing with Miley growing up. He has difficulty accepting the fact that she is no longer a child and therefore has a tendency to treat her as a child. As a single parent, he also finds himself over protective of Miley.

A milestone in their relationship occurs in the episode "I Want You to Want Me... to Go to Florida" in which Robby allows Miley to travel to a charity concert in Florida without him. This represents a large step in his moving toward accepting Miley's independence. He admits to Miley: "no daddy ever wants to see his little girl grow up, [but] every dad knows someday she has to." Another episode to explore this theme is "It's a Mannequin's World." Miley tells Lily that ever since her mom died, she's gotten bad presents from her dad. For this birthday, he got her a pink sweater with a cat on it that meows when you pinch it. Later in the episode, Robby Ray admits he only bought that for Miley because she's still his little girl.

He lets her date, but when she brings a date home, he does become embarrassing. For example, when she brought Jake home he gave them two seconds to kiss. And when her and Jake were alone and started to make out, from the air vent Robby told them to stop kissing and start talking.

He has many nicknames for Miley: Mile, Miles, Baby Girl, Little Girl and most often used: Bud. Miley hates most of her nicknames except for Mile, Miles and Bud. In Don't Go Breaking My Tooth he tells Tim McGraw he has to take his baby girl to the dentist, which makes Miley mad, since she hates being referred to as a baby.

Similarity to Billy Ray Cyrus 
Billy Ray Cyrus inspired many aspects of the Robby Stewart character. Both men are country musicians from Tennessee and share a middle name. Cyrus's real life relationship with Miley Cyrus is identical to Robby's relationship with Miley Stewart in the show. Miley Cyrus has said in interviews that the show's writers received inspiration for the show by listening to her and her father talking. Also, the depiction of Robbie Ray as a has-been country star is meant to poke fun at Cyrus's own music career, which by some was labeled a one hit wonder before the popularity of Hannah Montana.

Robby and other characters on Hannah Montana occasionally reference Cyrus's real-life music and television careers.
 In "It's a Mannequin's World" Robby cracks his back walking underneath a limbo stick and cries out "Oh, my achy breaky back!" This is a reference to the song "Achy Breaky Heart," Cyrus's signature song.
 In "Ooo, Ooo, Itchy Woman" Robby asks a musically gifted mouse if it can play "Achy Breaky Heart" on the piano.
 In "On the Road Again" it is revealed that "I Want My Mullet Back," a song from Cyrus's 2006 album Wanna Be Your Joe, is also one of Robbie Ray's signature hits.
 In "New Kid in School" Robby does an exaggerated "impersonation" of Billy Ray Cyrus wearing a mullet wig.
 In "Get Down, Study-udy-udy" Robby sings "I Want My Mullet Back" and "Wanna Be Your Joe" from his 2006 album Wanna Be Your Joe.
 In "I Am Hannah, Hear Me Croak" Jackson says his dad would know a good doctor, a reference to Cyrus's role on the television series Doc.
 In "My Best Friend's Boyfriend" Robby made fun of "those stupid dance shows" on television. Cyrus appeared on the fourth season of Dancing with the Stars.
 The episode titled "Achy Jakey Heart (Part 1 & 2)" are reference to "Achy Breaky Heart".
 In "Achy Jakey Heart, Part 2" Robby's line "Good night, Nurse Nichol." was a reference to Nurse Nancy Nichols, a character on Doc.
 In "Sleepwalk This Way," Robby has a Gibson Dove he names "Lucky Lulu." This is Cyrus personal guitar which he has performed with outside of the show, even calling it "Lucky Lulu."
 In "I Want You to Want Me... to Go to Florida" Robby writes the song "Ready, Set, Don't Go" for Miley. This song, which appeared in Cyrus's 2007 album Home at Last, was written by Billy Ray Cyrus for Miley Cyrus.
 In "Everybody Was Best Friend Fighting" a palm reader (Karina Smirnoff, who was Cyrus's partner on Dancing with the Stars), tells Robby that she sees him dancing in front of many people. Robby says that he's not much of a dancer. The palm reader replies that she can see that too.
 In "Bye Bye Ball" Robby watches Hannah and Joey Vitolo (Joey Fatone) dancing and comments "If I could dance like that I'd give myself a 10," referencing to his appearance on Dancing with the Stars. Fatone had appeared on the show on the same season Cyrus performed.
 In "The Way We Almost Weren't," Jackson and Miley experience a flashback to June 2, 1987, where they meet Robby in a New Mexico café. He is trying to write "Achy Breaky Heart," but is struggling with the right adjectives, first trying "itchy twitchy" and "herky jerky." When Jackson suggests "achy breaky," Robby dismisses it as "the dumbest thing I've ever heard."
 In "Can't Get Home to You Girl", a fan of Robby Ray offer to take Miley and Robby to the airport in Tucson. He refers to Robby as "Mullet Man" and "The Achy Breaky Robby Ray", and asks him for a picture. Later, they are shown on the road in the fan's truck, singing "I Want My Mullet Back".

Since Billy Ray Cyrus impersonated himself with his character, this hints that Cyrus and his daughter Miley may exist in the show's universe.

Notes 

Billy Ray Cyrus
Hannah Montana characters
Fictional writers
Fictional characters from Malibu, California
Fictional managers
Fictional singers
Fictional characters from Tennessee
Fictional twins
Television characters introduced in 2006